Brenda L. Strong Frazier (born 1941) is an American politician and activist. Born in Shelby, North Carolina, Frazier and her family moved to Allegheny County, Pennsylvania, in 1943. She received a bachelor's degree in elementary education at the Indiana University of Pennsylvania and began working as an elementary school teacher in Pittsburgh. She joined the First Pittsburgh chapter of the National Organization for Women (NOW) in 1975 and helped to found the East End chapter of the organization, which required the election of two presidents: one white and one Black. She served as chair of NOW's national minority women's committee. 

Frazier was elected to the Allegheny County Council for District 13 in 2001 as a Democrat. She founded and chaired the Allegheny County Black Elected Officials organization. She was re-elected in 2004 and 2008, although she resigned her position on February 11, 2008, to run for a seat in the Pennsylvania House of Representatives. She lost the Democratic primary to Dom Costa. Following the unsuccessful election, she joined the Pennsylvania Democratic Committee and founded the organization's Black caucus.

Early life 
Frazier was born in 1941 in Shelby, North Carolina. Her father worked during World War II in the steel mills before taking a job with a railroad company and opening a dry cleaning business. Her mother was a teacher who often had a difficult time finding work as a result of her gender and race. She was the eldest of eight children and her family moved to Whitaker, Pennsylvania, in 1943 where they lived in segregated public housing. The family also lived in West Mifflin, Braddock, and Homestead. Frazier attended Homestead High School and Braddock High School. She graduated with a bachelor's degree in elementary education from the Indiana University of Pennsylvania. Inspired by her aunt who led her local chapter of the NAACP in New Jersey, Frazier became involved in activism while at university, attending sit-ins at restaurants that were still segregated and joining the 1963 civil rights march in Washington, D.C.

She began working as an elementary school teacher in Pittsburgh, where she became involved with the teacher's union. She received further diplomas in special needs education and completed some graduate studies at the University of Pittsburgh and Carlow University. She received her certification in real estate from the Community College of Allegheny County. She taught in public schools from 1964 to 1969 and from 1988 to 1997. She met fellow teacher Andrew Frazier, whom she married in 1969. The couple had three children: Andrew Jr., Evan, and Janine. The family was part of the integration of a white neighborhood in Pittsburgh and Frazier brought her children to meetings and rallies in Washington, D.C.

Activism 
In 1975, Frazier was recruited by a neighbor to join the First Pittsburgh chapter of the National Organization for Women (NOW). However, she was determined that she would continue to focus on combating racism, even after joining NOW. She had been a member of the East Hills chapter of NOW in Pittsburgh but along with five other members, including Carol Titus, Frazier worked to found the East End chapter which had by-laws that required the election of two presidents, one white and one African American. The chapter organized a conference focusing on racism and sexism in Pittsburgh and campaigned for the national board of NOW to pass a resolution that would ensure that African American women were represented on the board. She was inspired by the 1978 national conference but continued to challenge white feminists and African American leaders about the connection between racism and sexism; she urged Jesse Jackson to consider the importance of the women's movement. Frazier was appointed as one of the chairs of the national organization's minority women's committee, alongside Jackie Washington and Val Cafee, and she organized a task force on Black feminism. She served on the board of the Pennsylvania branch and national organization.

She was a board member of the Pittsburgh Partnership for Neighborhood Development and vice president of the North Side Community Leadership Fund. She was a president of the Stanton Heights Civic Association and a member of the Young Women's Christian Association (YWCA) Women's Advisory Commission. She helped to found the parent-teacher association at Peabody High School. Frazier was a delegate for Pennsylvania, representing the 14th congressional district at the 1980 Democratic National Convention and the 2004 Democratic National Convention. She endorsed Democrat John Kerry in the 2004 presidential election. She is also a supporter of LGBT issues and the Equal Rights Amendment (ERA).

Political career 
Frazier was first elected to the Allegheny County Council for District 13 in 2001, taking over the two year remainder of Tom Foerster's term in office. She ran as a Democrat but was not endorsed by the party, likely due to her connections with Republican Jim Roddey, who was serving as the county's chief executive. Frazier had been appointed by Roddey to his transition team. She received 4,735 votes in the Democratic primary on May 15, 2001, beating Robert Biel with 3,955 votes, Richard Stahl with 3,058 votes, Vernon L. Boozer with 828 votes, and Daniel Styche with 453 votes. She was the first Black woman elected to the county council following its establishment as a home-rule government the year prior and was one of three members of the fifteen-person council who was not a white man. Frazier served as chair of the organization that she founded, the Allegheny County Black Elected Officials. She chaired the health and human services committee and was a member of the appointment review, budget and finance, economic development, government relations, and campaign reforms committees.

She won re-election in 2004, running against Richard Stahl for the second time. In both elections, she was not endorsed by any political party but won the Democratic primary and the general election. She did receive the endorsement of the Pittsburgh-Post Gazette in both elections. She was approached in 2005 about contesting the election for the mayor of Pittsburgh. She was the co-sponsor of legislation to add term limits for volunteers serving on county boards. In 2007, she ran against Matthew Arena, who won the Democratic Party endorsement. He challenged Frazier's nominating petition in the court of common pleas, a case which was unsuccessful but which he appealed to the Commonwealth Court. 

She resigned from the County Council on February 11, 2008, to run for a seat in the Pennsylvania House of Representatives. Her position on the council was filled by Amanda Green. She contested the 21st district in the seat vacated by Lisa Bennington. She ran in the Democratic primary on April 22, 2008, against Len Bodack and Dom Costa, but finished third with 4,595 votes to Costa's 4,940 votes and Bodack's 4,703 votes. She was opposed by HosPAC, a political group consisting of members of the hospitality industry, who campaigned against Frazier as a result of her vote in favor of a 10 percent tax on poured drinks in Allegheny County.

Later life 
She served on the Pennsylvania Democratic Committee and was the founder of a Black caucus within the organization. Her husband died on December 22, 2014. The formation of the East End chapter of NOW was honored in an exhibit entitled 'Strength in the Struggle: Civil Rights' at the August Wilson Center. Frazier was also interviewed for In Sisterhood: The Women's Movement in Pittsburgh, a multimedia project run by Patricia Ulbrich. She was honored on February 28, 2015, at a Black History Month dinner hosted by Classic Events, a public relations firm in Wilkinsburg, Pennsylvania.

References 

Living people
1941 births
Activists from Pittsburgh
Indiana University of Pennsylvania alumni
20th-century American women
American feminists
National Organization for Women people